Melanonus is a genus of gadiform fishes containing just two species of cod-like marine fishes.  This is the only genus in the family Melanonidae.

They live in the midwaters of the Atlantic, Pacific and Indian Oceans, well away from coasts.

Species
The currently recognized species in this genus are:
 Melanonus gracilis Günther, 1878 (pelagic cod)
 Melanonus zugmayeri Norman, 1930 (arrowtail)

References

Melanonidae
Taxa named by Albert Günther